Algestrup is a manor house and estate located close to Kalundborg, Denmark.

History

1627-1809: Adeler and Berner families
 
A village by the same name was until the middle of the 18th century located at the site. The village and all its land was from 1728 owned by Friederich Adeler. In 1756, he was granted royal permission to dissolve the village and merge all the land into a single manor. Adeler's father, Frederik Christian von Adeler, was a major landowner who had also served as amtmann of Roskilde, Tryggevælde and finally Zealand. His grandfather was Cort Adeler.

 
Adeler had inherited the esta Egemarke after his father.  In 1759, he was sent to Norway as amtmann. He then ceded Algestrup and Egemærke to  his son-in-law, Helmuth Gotthardt von Barner. A military officer, Barner reached the rank of lieutenant-colonel in 1756 and colonel in 1769.

Berner's wife, Louise Christiane von Adeler, died just 28 years old in May 1759. He was later married second time with Henriette Margrethe von Lente-Adeler, a daughter of Theodor von Lente-Adeler of Lykkesholm and Leopoldine Cathrine Jørgensdatter Rosenkrantz. Sje kept the estate after her husband's death. In 1773, she ceded it to their son Theodor von Barner.

1809-1867: Changing owners
Johannes Schartau, a merchant from Copenhagen, purchased the estate in 1809. He was like many others hit by the economic crisis of the 1810s and in 1823 Algestrup was sold in a forced sale. The buyer was the crown and a new main building was subsequently built on the estate.

In 1842, Algestrup was again sold in a public auction. The buyer was this time timber merchant Hans Hansen. In 1854, Algestrup was sold to  Vilhelm Maag.

1867-present: Lemvigh family
Jacob Christian Henrik Lemvigh, the son of a parish priest in Krummestrup and Fuglebjerg, purchased Algestrup in 1867. He and his wife  sband of Christine Sophie Steenbach had two children, Christian Henrik Lemvigh and Elisabeth Charlotte Lemvigh.  Christian Henrik Lemvigh leased Holtegaard before acquiring Algistrup Manor in 1913. Elisabeth Charlotte Lemvigh took over Algestrup following her father's death in 1919. She left the estate to her niece, Edith Hedemann Lemvigh, who in turn left it to her nephew Ib Holger Lemvigh (1929-2015). He was succeeded by his son of the same name.

A side wing was in 2019 hit by fire.

Architecture
The main building from 1834 is a white-washed, three-winged complex in a single storey. It has been adapted and extended in 1867, 1876 og 1884. Four rooms contain murals of flowers and birds by the artist Erik Herløw Mads Jensen Tanggaard. The architect constructed a new veranda in 1956.

List of owners
 (1728-1759)Frederik Adeler 
 (1759-1769)Helmuth Gotthardt von Barner 
 (1769-1782)Henriette Margrethe von Barner, née Lente-Adeler 
 (1782-1809)Leopold Theodor von Barner 
 (1809)Regitze Sophie Krabbe, gift von Barner 
 (1809-1823) Johannes Schartau 
 (1823-1842) Kronen 
 (1842-1854) Hans Hansen 
 (1854-1867) Vilhelm Maag 
 (1867-1919) Jacob Christian Henrik Lemvigh 
 (1919-1935) Elisabeth Charlotte Lemvigh 
 (1935-1964) Ib Holger Lemvigh 
 (1964-2005) Ib Holger Lemvigh Jr. 
 (2000–present) Jacob Christian Henrik Lemvigh

References 

Manor houses in Kalundborg Municipality
Buildings and structures associated with the Adeler family